The Culver Model V was a two-seat cabin monoplane designed and built by the Culver Aircraft Company.

Design and development
Based on the pre-World War II Cadet and using the wartime experience with radio-controlled aircraft the company designed a two-seat cabin monoplane. The Model V had a low-set cantilever wing with the outer panels having a pronounced dihedral. It had a tricycle retractable landing gear and an enclosed cabin with side by side seating for two. It was unique in that it had a system called Simpli-Fly Control where the aircraft was automatically trimmed for takeoff, landing and cruise, by turning a small metal wheel between the two seats and lining up two arrows with the mode of flying the aircraft. Interconnecting controls then adjusted the trim according to the arrow settings.

In 1956 the Superior Aircraft Company bought the assets of Culver and put the Model V back into production as the Superior Satellite. The main difference was the use of a 95 hp Continental engine which increased the cruise speed to 130 mph (209 km/h). Only a prototype and five production aircraft were built.

Variants
V-1
Initial production variant.
V-2
Improved variant.
Superior Satellite
1956 variant with a 95hp Continental engine.
TD4C
USN radio-controlled target version of the V-2
UC
The utility version of the TD4C, also converted to target drone as the UC-1K.

Specifications (V-1)

References

Notes

Bibliography

External links

 Photo at aerofiles.com
 "Culver Model V", August 1946, Popular Science large pull out color photo

V
1940s United States civil utility aircraft
Single-engined tractor aircraft
Low-wing aircraft
Target drones of the United States
Aircraft first flown in 1946